The Academy of Canadian Cinema & Television's 20th Gemini Awards were held on November 19, 2005, to honour achievements in Canadian television. The awards show, which was co-hosted by several celebrities, took place at the John Bassett Theatre and was broadcast on Global.

Best Dramatic Series
The Eleventh Hour - Alliance Atlantis Communications. Producers: Ilana Frank, Semi Chellas, Ray Sager, David Wellington, Daphne Park, Peter R. Simpson
Da Vinci’s Inquest - Haddock Entertainment, Barna-Alper Productions, Alliance Atlantis Productions, Canadian Broadcasting Corporation. Producers: Chris Haddock, Laszlo Barna, Arvi Liimatainen, Laura Lightbown
Degrassi: The Next Generation - Bell Media, Epitome Pictures. Producers: Stephen Stohn, Linda Schuyler, Aaron Martin
This Is Wonderland - Muse Entertainment, Indian Grove Productions. Producers: Bernard Zukerman, Michael Prupas, Dani Romain, George F. Walker 
Godiva's - Keatley Entertainment, CHUM. Producers: Julia Keatley, Gigi Boyd, Michael MacLennan
ReGenesis - The Movie Network, Movie Central, Shaftesbury Films. Producers: Christina Jennings, Tom Chehak, Scott Garvie, Laura Harbin, Shane Kinnear, Virginia Rankin

Best Dramatic Mini-Series
Sex Traffic - Big Motion Pictures. Producers: Wayne Grigsby, Michele Buck, David MacLeod, Derek Wax
H2O - Whizbang Films. Producers: Paul Gross, Frank Siracusa
Lives of the Saints - Capri Films, PowerCorp, RTI. Producers: Gabriella Martinelli, Giovanna Arata

Best TV Movie
Tripping the Wire: A Stephen Tree Mystery - Galafilm. Producers: Arnie Gelbart, Francine Allaire, Anne Marie La Traverse
Murdoch Mysteries: Except the Dying - Shaftesbury Films. Producers: Christina Jennings, Scott Garvie, Laura Harbin, Virginia Rankin, Kim Todd
Burn: The Robert Wraight Story - Alberta Filmworks, CTV Television Network, Monkeywrench Productions, Tapestry Pictures. Producers: Heather Haldane, Randy Bradshaw, Doug MacLeod, Mary Young Leckie
The Last Casino - Astral Films. Producers: Greg Dummett, Madeline Henrie
The Life - CTV Television Network, Haddock Entertainment, Odd Man Out Productions, Sarrazin Couture Entertainment. Producers: Chris Haddock, Laura Lightbown, Lynn Barr, Arvi Liimatainen, Pierre Sarrazin

Best Comedy Program or Series
Corner Gas - CTV Television Network, Prairie Pants Productions. Producers: Brent Butt, Mark Farrell, David Storey, Virginia Thompson, Paul Mather
History Bites - The History Channel. Producers: Rick Green, David C. Smith
Puppets Who Kill - Eggplant Picture & Sound. Producers: John Pattison, Marianne Culbert, John Leitch, Shawn Thompson
The Newsroom - 100% Film and Television, Canadian Broadcasting Corporation, Showcase, Telefilm Canada. Producers: Ken Finkleman, Jan Peter Meyboom
This Hour Has 22 Minutes - Alliance Atlantis, Canadian Broadcasting Corporation. Producers: Michael Donovan, Geoff D’Eon, Mark Farrell, Jack Kellum, Susan MacDonald, Jenipher Ritchie

Best Music, Variety Program or Series
2004 MuchMusic Video Awards - MuchMusic). Producers: John Kampilis, Dave Russell
2004 Canadian Country Music Awards - Canadian Country Music Association, CBC Television. Producers: Michael Watt, Aidan Cosgrove, Anne Hunter
Live at the Rehearsal Hall - Bravo!. Producers: Robert Benson, John Gunn
The Chieftains in Canada - Canadian Broadcasting Corporation. Producers: Michael Lewis, Geoff D’Eon 
Canadian Idol - Insight Productions, 19 Entertainment, FremantleMedia North America, Canadian Broadcasting Corporation. Producers: John Brunton, Barbara Bowlby, Sue Brophey, Martha Kehoe, Mark Lysakowski

Best Performing Arts Program or Series, or Arts Documentary Program or Series
Camp Hollywood - Hirsh Markle Films. Producers: Steve Markle, David Julian Hirsh
Alter Egos - Copperheart Entertainment, National Film Board of Canada. Producers: Steven Hoban, Mark Smith, Adam Symansky
Opening Night - The Four Seasons Mosaic - Canadian Broadcasting Corporation. Producers: Robin Neinstein, Robert Cohen, Shari Cohen
Drawing Out The Demons: A Film about the Artist Attila Richard Lukacs - Screen Siren Pictures. Producers: Trish Dolman, Stephanie Symns
Jean-Pierre Perreault: Giant Steps - National Film Board of Canada. Producers: Lisa Cochrane, Yves Bisaillon

Best Talk Series
Health on the Line - HOTL Productions. Producers: Linda Boyle, Lesley Birchard, Bonnie Hewitt, Terra Renton, Karen Yarosky, Jennifer Fraser, Hedy Korbee
Mansbridge One on One - Canadian Broadcasting Corporation. Producers: Jonathan Whitten, Jasmin Tuffaha
Hot Type - CBC Newsworld. Producers: Alice Hopton, Janet Thomson, Donna Lee Aprile 
Medical Hotseat - Medical Hotseat Productions. Producers: Hedy Korbee, Helen Bagshaw, Linda Boyle, Jeanette Diehl, Greg Dennis, Jennifer Fraser
Vicki Gabereau - Canadian Broadcasting Corporation. Producers: Cynthia Ott, Jordan Schwartz, Mark Fuller

Best Reality Program or Series
Venture - The Town Doctor - Canadian Broadcasting Corporation. Producers: Patsy Pehleman, Tracie Tighe
Buy Me - Whalley-Abbey Media. Producers: Debbie Travis, Hans Rosenstein, Jean-Francois Monette
Made to Order - Mercer Street Films. Producers: Michael Rubino, Henry Less

Best General/Human Interest Series
>play presents - Canadian Broadcasting Corporation. Producer: Donna Lee Aprile
SexTV - CHUM Television, Corus Entertainment. Producers: Cynthia Loyst, Brad Brough, Marcia Martin
Body of Knowledge - Canadian Broadcasting Corporation. Producers: Charles Bishop, Mary Lynk
Heartbeats - Breakthrough Entertainment. Producers: Ira Levy, Kirsten Scollie, Barri Cohen, Peter Williamson, Ron Singer
Past Life Investigation - Canadian Broadcasting Corporation. Producers: Sarah Kapoor, Catherine May, Tracie Tighe

Donald Brittain Award for Best Social/Political Documentary Program
Runaway Grooms - Asli Films. Producer: Ali Kazimi
Rage Against the Darkness: Bunny and Leona - J.S. Kastner Productions. Producers: Deborah Parks, John Kastner
El Contrato - National Film Board of Canada. Producer: Karen King
No Place Called Home - National Film Board of Canada. Producer: Peter Starr
One More River: The Deal That Split the Cree - Rezolution Pictures. Producers: Catherine Bainbridge, Ernest Webb
The Take - Barna-Alper Productions, Canadian Broadcasting Corporation, National Film Board of Canada, Klein Lewis Productions. Producers: Naomi Klein, Avi Lewis, Laszlo Barna, Silva Basmajian

Best Documentary Series
Witness - Canadian Broadcasting Corporation. Producers: Marie Natanson, Hilary Armstrong
Legendary Sin Cities: Paris, Berlin and Shanghai - Canadian Broadcasting Corporation, Demi-Monde Productions. Producers: Ted Remerowski, Marrin Canell
The Nature of Things - Canadian Broadcasting Corporation. Producer: Michael Allder
The Passionate Eye - Canadian Broadcast Corporation. Producers: Catherine Olsen, Charlotte Odele, Diane Rotteau
Rough Cuts - CBC Newsworld. Producer: Andrew Johnson

Best History Documentary Program
Stolen Spirits of Haida Gwaii - Primitive Entertainment. Producers: Michael McMahon, Kristina McLaughlin
Turning Points of History - D-Day on Juno Beach - Barna-Alper Productions, Connections Productions. Producers: Laszlo Barna, Alan Mendelsohn
Escape from Iran: The Hollywood Option - Partners in Motion. Producers: Nova Herman, Ron Goetz
To Build a Nation: Vimy Carved in Stone - Nation Building Productions. Producers: Janice Tufford, Laszlo Barna
Zero Hour - Massacre at Columbine High - Cineflix. Producers: Andre Barro, Simon Berthon, David Hickman, Dan Korn

Best Biography Documentary Program
Ronnie Hawkins: Still Alive and Kickin' - Real to Reel Productions. Producer: Anne Pick
Life and Times - Lord Black of Crossharbour: The Life and Times of Conrad Black - Canadian Broadcasting Corporation. Producers: Halya Kuchmij, Douglas Arrowsmith, Linda Laughlin, Marie Natanson
Life and Times - Madiba: The Life & Times of Nelson Mandela - Canadian Broadcasting Corporation. Producer: Robin Benger
Life and Times - The Biographer's Voice: The Life and Times of Peter C. Newman - Canadian Broadcasting Corporation. Producers: Gordon Henderson, Mike Sheerin
The Greatest Canadian - The Great Tommy Douglas - Canadian Broadcasting Corporation. Producers: Guy O'Sullivan, Rachel Houlihan
The True Intrepid: Sir William Stephenson, Declassified - MidCanada Entertainment, Global Television Network. Producer: Kevin Dunn

Best Science, Technology, Nature, Environment or Adventure Documentary Program
The Origins of AIDS - Canadian Broadcasting Corporation, Galafilm, Channel Four Television Corporation, Frame 2, Les Films de la Passerelle, Multimédia France Productions, Produce+, Radio Télévision Belge Francophone, Pathé Archives. Producers: Arnie Gelbart, Michel Crepon, Christine Le Goff, Christine Pereaux
The Nature of Things - Sex Lies and Secrecy: Dissecting Hysterectomy - CBC. Producers: Carol Moore-Ede, Michael Allder
The Nature of Things - Clot Busters - CBC. Producers: David Tucker, Michael Allder
A Day Inside: Calgary Stampede. Producers: Lance Mueller, Jean Merriman
Diet of Souls - Triad Film Productions. Producer: Peter d'Entremont

Best News Information Series
W5 - CTV Television Network. Producers: Malcolm Fox, Anton Koschany
the fifth estate - Canadian Broadcasting Corporation. Producers: David Studer, Sally Reardon
Venture - Canadian Broadcasting Corporation. Producers: Patsy Pehleman, Dianne Buckner
Marketplace - Canadian Broadcasting Corporation. Producers: Tassie Notar, Leslie Peck, Sheilagh D’Arcy McGee
Eurohealth - Global Television Network. Producers: David Ingram, Brian Coxford

Best News Magazine Segment
The National/CBC News - Strange Destiny - Canadian Broadcasting Corporation. Producers: Brian Kelly, Carmen Merrifield, Gary Akenhead, Andy Hincenbergs, Brian Stewart
The National/CBC News - Ray of Light - Canadian Broadcasting Corporation. Producers: Michael Taylor-Noonan, Terry Milewski, Sat Nandlall, Cedric Monteiro
The National/CBC News - Healing Hikkaduwa - Canadian Broadcasting Corporation. Producers: Ian Kalushner, Adrienne Arsenault, Glen Kugelstadt, Michael Taylor-Noonan
CBC News: Sunday Night - Canadian Broadcasting Corporation. Producers: Greg Kelly, Tania White, Eric Foss
Studio 2 - (TVOntario). Producers: Elizabeth Payne, Ken Hillier, Paul Colbourne, Horst Mueller, Leora Eisen

Best Newscast
CTV National News - CTV Television Network. Producers: Wendy Freeman, Tom Haberstroh, David Hughes
The National/CBC News - Canadian Broadcasting Corporation. Producers: Jonathan Whitten, Mark Harrison, Fred Parker, Lynn Kelly, Bob Waller
Global National - Global National with Kevin Newman - Global News. Producers: George Browne, Doriana Temolo, Kevin Newman, Elaine McKay, Erin Lawrence

Best News Special Event Coverage
CBC News: RCMP Memorial - Canadian Broadcasting Corporation. Producers: Mark Bulgutch, Fred Parker
The National/CBC News - Road to Recovery - Canadian Broadcasting Corporation. Producers: Jonathan Whitten, Fred Parker
CBC News: Canada Votes - Election Night - Canadian Broadcasting Corporation. Producers: Mark Bulgutch, Fred Parker
CBC News: Canada Votes - The 60th Anniversary Of D-Day - Canadian Broadcasting Corporation. Producers: Mark Bulgutch, Fred Parker
CTV News - Death of a Pope - CTV Television Network. Producers: Kathleen O'Keefe, Tom Haberstroh, Brian LeBold, Joanne MacDonald

Best Lifestyle/Practical Information Series
Debbie Travis' Facelift - Whalley-Abbey Media. Producers: Debbie Travis, Hans Rosenstein
Chef At Large - Ocean Entertainment. Producers: Johanna Eliot, Gretha Rose
Design Inc. - Producers: Sarah Richardson, Michael Prini
Holmes on Homes - General Purpose Entertainment. Producer: Scott Clark McNeil
The Surreal Gourmet - Salad Daze Productions. Producers: Lon J. Hall, Dale Burshtein, Beth Fanjoy

Best Lifestyle/Practical Information Segment
Canada Now - Canadian Broadcasting Corporation. Producers: Conway Fraser, Ray Bourrier, Catherine McIsaac, David Donnelly, Lani Selick, Allison Crawford, Ron Sloan, Terry Stapleton, Barbara Brunzell, Neil Clarkson, Dale Foster
Daily Planet - Discovery Channel. Producers: Kevin Mills, Mark Miller
SexTV - Pink or Blue: The Science of Sex Selection - CHUM Television/Corus Entertainment. Producer: Cynthia Loyst
ZeD - Pumpkin Boats - CBC. Producers: Ted McInnes, Alison Bruce, Scott MacEachern

Best Animated Program or Series
Dragon Booster - ApolloScreen Filmproduktion, Nerd Corps Entertainment, The Story Hat, Alliance Atlantis. Producers: Asaph Fipke, Ken Faier, Kevin Mowrer
Atomic Betty - Atomic Cartoons, Breakthrough Entertainment, Tele Images Productions, Marathon Media. Producers: Steven Hecht, Virginia Jallot, Ira Levy, Nghia Nguyen, Kirsten Scollie, Peter Williamson, Kevin Gillis, Rob Davies, Philippe Alessandri, Trevor Bentley, Simone Harari
Being Ian - Studio B Productions, Nelvana. Producers: Chris Bartleman, Kathy Antonsen Rocchio, Blair Peters
Jacob Two-Two - Nelvana, Salter Street Films. Producers: Scott Dyer, Peter Moss, Patricia R. Burns, Jocelyn Hamilton, Doug Murphy
Miss Spider's Sunny Patch Kids - Nelvana, Callaway Arts & Entertainment. Producers: Scott Dyer, Nicholas Callaway, Patricia R. Burns, David Kirk, Paul W. Robertson, Nadine van der Velde, Jocelyn Hamilton, Doug Murphy, Andy Russell

Best Pre-School Program or Series
Peep and the Big Wide World - WGBH-TV, 9 Story Media Group, TVOntario, Eggbox, Discovery Kids, National Film Board of Canada. Producers: Kate Taylor, Vince Commisso, Marisa Wolsky
Poko - Poko II - Halifax Film Company. Producers: Michael Donovan, Charles Bishop, Jeff Rosen, Katrina Walsh, Cheryl Wagner
Franny's Feet - Decode Entertainment, Family Channel, Channel 5. Producers: Steve Denure, Elana Adair, Neil Court, John Mariella, Beth Stevenson
This is Daniel Cook - TVOntario, Treehouse TV, Marblemedia, Sinking Ship Entertainment. Producers: Matthew Bishop, Matthew Hornburg, J. J. Johnson, Blair Powers, Mark J.W. Bishop
The Secret World of Benjamin Bear - Amberwood Entertainment, Philippine Animation Studio, Bell Fund. Producers: Sheldon S. Wiseman, Ken Anderson, Cherylyn Brooks, Mark Edwards

Best Children's or Youth Fiction Program or Series
Radio Free Roscoe - Decode Entertainment. Producers: Steve Denure, Neil Court, Brent Piaskoski, John Delmage, Doug McRobb, Will McRobb, Beth Stevenson
15/Love - Marathon Media. Producers: Jesse Fawcett, Derek Schreyer, Arnie Gelbart, Olivier Brémond, Karen Troubetzkoy, Pascal Breton, Leanna Crouch
Fries with That? - YTV. Producers: Claudio Luca, Rosanne Cohen, Paul Risacher
Fungus the Bogeyman - BBC, Galafilm, Indie Kids, Powercorp. Producers: Ian Whitehead, Dan Maddicott, Arnie Gelbart, Michael Haggiag. 
Instant Star - DHX Media. Producers: Linda Schuyler, Stephen Stohn

Best Children's or Youth Non-Fiction Program or Series
Street Cents - Canadian Broadcasting Corporation. Producers: Barbara Kennedy, Wendy Purves
The View from Here - Angry Girls - TVOntario). Producers: Rudy Buttignol, Deborah Parks, Shelley Saywell
My Brand New Life - National Film Board of Canada. Producers: Ina Fichman, Pierre Lapointe
Mystery Hunters - Apartment 11 Productions. Producers: Jonathan Finkelstein, Jason Levy, Stacey Tenenbaum
Nerve - Canadian Broadcasting Corporation. Producers: Ralph Benmergui, Andrea Gabourie

Best Sports Program or Series
Ben Johnson: Drugs and the Quest for Gold - Infinity Films. Producers: Shel Piercy, Ken Craw
Life and Times - The Life and Times of Northern Dancer - Canadian Broadcasting Corporation. Producers: Halya Kuchmij, Linda Laughlin, Marie Natanson
Making the Cut - Network Entertainment. Producers: Derik Murray, John Hamilton, Scott Moore
Football First: The Roy Shivers Story - Canadian Broadcasting Corporation. Producers: Costa Maragos, Lori Kuffner
Dave Bidini: The Hockey Nomad - Mercury Films. Producers: Mike Downie, Dave Bidini, Gordon Henderson

Best Live Sporting Event
2005 Tim Hortons Brier - CBC Sports. Producer: Don Peppin
CFL on TSN- Wendy's Friday Night Football: Montreal at Hamilton - TSN. Producers: Paul McLean, Jon Hynes
The 2004 Stanley Cup Finals - Game Seven: Calgary vs Tampa - CBC Sports. Producers: Joel Darling, Chris Irwin, Sherali Najak

Best Interactive
Corner Gas www.cornergas.com. Producers: Virginia Thompson, David Storey, Brent Butt, Leif Kaldor (CTV Television Network, Prairie Pants Productions)
renegadepress.com: renegadepress.com - Vérité Films. Producers: Gail Bryanton, Robert de Lint, Virginia Thompson
Word Wizard - TVOntario. Producers: Jennifer Burkitt, Pat Ellingson
Deafplanet: deafplanet.com - Marblemedia, Canadian Cultural Society of the Deaf. Producers: Mark J.W. Bishop, Matthew Hornburg
ZeD - The New New Media - Canadian Broadcasting Corporation. Producers: Weston Triemstra, Tammy Everts

Best Direction in a Dramatic Program or Mini-Series
Chris Abraham - I, Claudia (CBC/Sienna Films)
Don McBrearty - Chasing Freedom (Alberta Filmworks/Blueprint Entertainment)
Pierre Gill - The Last Casino (Astral Films)
David Yates - Sex Traffic - Part 1 (Big Motion Pictures)
Stephen Surjik - Tripping the Wire: A Stephen Tree Mystery (Galafilm)

Best Direction in a Dramatic Series
David Wellington - The Eleventh Hour - Bumpy Cover (Alliance Atlantis) 
Steve DiMarco - The Eleventh Hour - In Spite of All the Damage (Alliance Atlantis) 
David Wellington - The Eleventh Hour - Eden (Alliance Atlantis) 
John L'Ecuyer - ReGenesis - Resurrection (The Movie Network/Movie Central/Shaftesbury Films)
Gary Harvey - Cold Squad - And the Fury (Keatley MacLeod Productions/Alliance Atlantis)

Best Direction in a News Information Program or Series
Oleh Rumak - the fifth estate - Do You Believe in Miracles? (CBC)
Claude Vickery - the fifth estate - The Girl in the Suitcase (CBC)
Kit Melamed - the fifth estate - Mister Nobody (CBC)
Morris Karp - the fifth estate - Sticks and Stones (CBC)
Marie Caloz - the fifth estate - First, Do No Harm (CBC)

Best Direction in a Documentary Program
Kevin McMahon - Stolen Spirits of Haida Gwaii (Primitive Entertainment)
John Kastner - Rage Against the Darkness: Bunny and Leona (J.S. Kastner Productions)
Craig Chivers - No Place Called Home (NFB)
Avi Lewis - The Take (Barna-Alper Productions/CBC/NFB/Klein Lewis Productions)
David Vaisbord - Drawing Out The Demons: A Film about the Artist Attila Richard Lukacs (Screen Siren Pictures)
Peter Raymont - Shake Hands with the Devil: The Journey of Roméo Dallaire (White Pine Pictures/CBC)

Best Direction in a Documentary Series
John Zaritsky - College Days, College Nights: Between Past and Present Tense (Point Grey Pictures)
Karen Shopsowitz - Canada's War in Colour (Yap Films) 
Jackie May - Life's Little Miracles - Home for the Holidays (Slice/CBC)
Rina Barone - Opening Soon - Milford Bistro (Red Apple Entertainment)
Carol Moore-Ede - The Nature of Things - Sex Lies and Secrecy: Dissecting Hysterectomy (CBC)

Best Direction in a Comedy Program or Series
Patrice Sauvé - Ciao Bella - To Forgive Is To Insult (Cirrus Communications)
Deborah Day - Getting Along Famously (Canadian Accents)
Henry Sarwer-Foner - Hatching, Matching and Dispatching (CBC)
Mike Clattenburg - Trailer Park Boys - Working Man (Showcase/Topsail Entertainment)
Shawn Thompson - Puppets Who Kill - Cuddles the Manchurian Candidate (Eggplant Picture & Sound)

Best Direction in a Variety Program or Series
Mario Rouleau - Cirque du Soleil: Midnight Sun (Arte/Amérimage-Spectra/Bravo!/CBC/Conte IV/Echo Media/ZDFtheaterkanal)
Shelagh O'Brien - East Coast Music Awards (East Coast Music Association/CBC Halifax)
Joan Tosoni - Juno Awards of 2005 (Canadian Academy of Recording Arts and Sciences/CTV)
Shelagh O'Brien - The Chieftains in Canada (CBC)
Joan Tosoni - The Greatest Canadian - Final Showdown (CBC)

Best Direction in a Performing Arts Program or Series
Larry Weinstein - Beethoven's Hair (BBC/CBC/Dor Film/Rhombus Media/Telefilm Canada/Xenophile Media)
Byron McKim - Quest (Soaring Heart Pictures)
Veronica Tennant - A Pairing of Swans (Marblemedia/CBC)
Rosemary House - Bloomsday Cabaret (Rock Island Productions)
Pierre Séguin - Nomade: At Night, the Sky is Endless (Cirque Éloize)

Best Direction in a Lifestyle/Practical Information Program or Series
Henry Less - Made to Order (Mercer St. Films)
David Hansen - English Teachers III (WestWind Pictures)
Tracie Tighe - Venture - The Big Switcheroo - FedEx, Part 1 (CBC)
Mary Lynk - Body of Knowledge (CBC)
Linda McEwan - Real Renos (Smashing Pictures)
Romano D'Andrea - Style By Jury (Planetworks)

Best Direction in a Children's or Youth Program or Series
Graeme Campbell - Instant Star - You Can't Always Get What You Want (DHX Media)
Mauro Casalese, Jeffrey Agala, Ridd Sorensen - Atomic Betty - Atomic Roger, Toxic Talent (Atomic Cartoons/Breakthrough Entertainment/Tele Images Productions/Marathon Media)
Robert de Lint - renegadepress.com - Dying to Connect (Vérité Films)
Richard Mortimer, Sid Goldberg, Robert Higden - Surprise! It's Edible Incredible! - Matthew and Jordan (Apartment 11 Productions)
J. J. Johnson - This is Daniel Cook - This is Daniel Cook Doing Magic (TVOntario/Treehouse TV/Marblemedia/Sinking Ship Entertainment)

Best Direction in a Live Sporting Event
Ron Forsythe - CFL on CBC - 2004 West Division Championship (CBC Sports)
Paul Hemming - CFL on CBC : Wendy's Friday Night Football - Montreal at Hamilton (CBC Sports)
Paul Hemming - 2005 World Junior Ice Hockey Championships - Gold Medal Game (TSN)
Troy Clara - 2004 Memorial Cup - Final Game (Rogers Sportsnet)

Best Writing in a Dramatic Program or Mini-Series
Alan Di Fiore, Chris Haddock - The Life (CTV/Haddock Entertainment/Odd Man Out Productions/Sarrazin Couture Entertainment)
Paul Gross, John Krizanc - H2O - Night 1 (Whizbang Films)
Abi Morgan - Sex Traffic - Part 1 (Big Motion Pictures)
John Goldsmith, John Kent Harrison - A Bear Named Winnie (Original Pictures, Powercorp)
Barbara Samuels - Chasing Freedom (Alberta Filmworks/Blueprint Entertainment)

Best Writing in a Dramatic Series
Semi Chellas, Tassie Cameron - The Eleventh Hour - Bumpy Cover (Alliance Atlantis) 
Tassie Cameron - The Eleventh Hour - Hit Delete (Alliance Atlantis) 
Chris Haddock, Sylvia Leung, Jesse McKeown - Da Vinci’s Inquest - Must Be a Night For Fires (Haddock Entertainment/Barna-Alper Productions/Alliance Atlantis/CBC)
Dani Romain, George F. Walker - This Is Wonderland - Episode 2.11 (Muse Entertainment/Indian Grove Productions)
Jason Sherman - ReGenesis - Spare Parts (The Movie Network/Movie Central/Shaftesbury Films)
Martin Gero - Stargate Atlantis - The Brotherhood (Acme Shark Productions/Sony Pictures Television)

Best Writing in a Comedy or Variety Program or Series
Ken Finkleman - The Newsroom - Baghdad Bound (100% Film and Television/CBC/Showcase, Telefilm Canada)
Kevin White, Irwin Barker, Gavin Crawford, Mark Critch, Barry Julien, Gary Pearson, Jennifer Whalen - This Hour Has 22 Minutes - Episode 12.12 (Alliance Atlantis/CBC)
Colin Mochrie - Getting Along Famously (Canadian Accents)
Mary Walsh, Ed Macdonald - Hatching, Matching and Dispatching (CBC)
Mike Clattenburg, Barrie Dunn, Robb Wells, John Paul Tremblay, Jonathan Torrens, Michael A Volpe, Mike Smith, Iain Macleod - Trailer Park Boys Christmas Special (Showcase/Topsail Entertainment)

Best Writing in an Information Program or Series
Linden MacIntyre - the fifth estate - War Without Borders (CBC)
Victor Malarek, Margo Harper - W5 - Town Without Pity (CTV)
Bob McKeown - the fifth estate - Sticks and Stones (CBC)
Hana Gartner - the fifth estate - The Canadian (CBC)
Carol Off - The National/CBC News - Of Beauty Queens and Fatwas (CBC)

Best Writing in a Documentary Program or Series
Thomas Wallner - Beethoven's Hair (BBC/CBC/Dor Film/Rhombus Media/Telefilm Canada/Xenophile Media)
Steve Markle - Camp Hollywood (Hirsh Markle Films)
Terence McKenna - The National/CBC News - Bribes From Baghdad (CBC)
Peter Chappell, Arnie Gelbart, Stéphane Horel - The Origins of AIDS (Canadian Broadcasting Corporation, Galafilm, Channel Four Television Corporation, Frame 2, Les Films de la Passerelle, Multimédia France Productions, Produce+, Radio Télévision Belge Francophone, Pathé Archives)
Susan Martin - Runaway Grooms (Asli Films)

Best Writing in a Children's or Youth's Program or Series
Derek Schreyer - 15/Love - Renewal (Marathon Media)
Heather Conkie, Jana Sinyor - Dark Oracle (Cookie Jar Entertainment/Shaftesbury Films)
Mary Crawford, Alan Templeton - King - Stolen Voices (Decode Entertainment/Funbag Animation Studios)
Barry Julien, David Acer, Ramelle Mair - Mystery Hunters - Anastasia, Anna Anderson (Apartment 11 Productions)
Jordan Wheeler - renegadepress.com - Dying to Connect (Vérité Films)

Best Performance by an Actor in a Leading Role in a Dramatic Program or Mini-Series
Brendan Fletcher - The Death and Life of Nancy Eaton (Muse Entertainment/Indian Grove Productions/Studio Eight Productions/Voice Pictures)
Chris Diamantopoulos - Behind the Camera: The Unauthorized Story of Mork & Mindy (NBC Studios/Nomadic Pictures/Once Upon a Time Films)
Jonathan Scarfe - Burn: The Robert Wraight Story (Alberta Filmworks/CTV/Monkeywrench Productions/Tapestry Pictures)
Charles Martin Smith - The Last Casino (Astral Films)
John Simm - Sex Traffic - Part 1 (Big Motion Pictures)

Best Performance by an Actress in a Leading Role in a Dramatic Program or Mini-Series
Kristen Thomson - I, Claudia (CBC, Sienna Films)
Tina Keeper - Distant Drumming (Seven24 Films)
Wendy Crewson - Sex Traffic - Part 1 (Big Motion Pictures)
Anamaria Marinca - Sex Traffic - Part 1 (Big Motion Pictures)
Alisen Down - The Life (CTV/Haddock Entertainment/Odd Man Out Productions/Sarrazin Couture Entertainment)

Best Performance by an Actor in a Continuing Leading Dramatic Role
Michael Riley - This Is Wonderland - Episode 2.13 (Muse Entertainment/Indian Grove Productions)
Nicholas Campbell - Da Vinci’s Inquest - Mr. Ellis Himself Woulda Been Proud (Haddock Entertainment/Barna-Alper Productions/Alliance Atlantis/CBC)
Jeff Seymour - The Eleventh Hour - In Spite of All the Damage (Alliance Atlantis) 
Ben Bass - The Eleventh Hour - Eden (Alliance Atlantis) 
Peter Outerbridge - ReGenesis - Baby Bomb (The Movie Network/Movie Central/Shaftesbury Films)

Best Performance by an Actress in a Continuing Leading Dramatic Role
Cara Pifko - This Is Wonderland - Episode 2.12 (Muse Entertainment/Indian Grove Productions) 
Waneta Storms - The Eleventh Hour - Hit Delete (Alliance Atlantis) 
Julie Stewart - Cold Squad - And the Fury (Keatley MacLeod Productions/Alliance Atlantis)
Victoria Snow - Paradise Falls - Old Friends (Breakthrough Entertainment)
Tammy Isbell - Paradise Falls - What's the Hold Up? (Breakthrough Entertainment)

Best Performance by an Actor in a Guest Role Dramatic Series
Henry Czerny - The Eleventh Hour - Zugzwang (Alliance Atlantis) 
Shawn Doyle - The Eleventh Hour - Bumpy Cover (Alliance Atlantis) 
Luke Kirby - The Eleventh Hour - Hit Delete (Alliance Atlantis) 
David Cubitt - The Eleventh Hour - The Miracle Worker (Alliance Atlantis) 
Bernard Behrens - This Is Wonderland - Episode 2.07 (Muse Entertainment/Indian Grove Productions)

Best Performance by an Actress in a Guest Role Dramatic Series
Kristin Booth - ReGenesis - Spare Parts (The Movie Network/Movie Central/Shaftesbury Films)
Lolita Davidovich - The Eleventh Hour - Pot Kettle Black (Alliance Atlantis) 
Fiona Reid - This Is Wonderland - Episode 2.10 (Muse Entertainment/Indian Grove Productions) 
Dawn Greenhalgh - This Is Wonderland - Episode 2.06 (Muse Entertainment/Indian Grove Productions) 
Ann Holloway - This Is Wonderland - Episode 2.12 (Muse Entertainment/Indian Grove Productions) 
Diana Pavlovská - The Collector - The Historian (No Equal Entertainment)

Best Performance by an Actor in a Featured Supporting Role in a Dramatic Series
Michael Murphy - This Is Wonderland - Episode 2.02 (Muse Entertainment/Indian Grove Productions) 
Michael Healey - This Is Wonderland - Episode 2.07 (Muse Entertainment/Indian Grove Productions) 
Tom Rooney - This Is Wonderland - Episode 2.08 (Muse Entertainment/Indian Grove Productions) 
Noel Fisher - Godiva's - Masters of Delusion (Keatley Entertainment/CHUM)
Dmitry Chepovetsky - ReGenesis - The Promise (The Movie Network/Movie Central/Shaftesbury Films)

Best Performance by an Actress in a Featured Supporting Role in a Dramatic Series
Ellen Page - ReGenesis - Black Out (The Movie Network/Movie Central/Shaftesbury Films)
Catherine Fitch - This Is Wonderland - Episode 2.08 (Muse Entertainment/Indian Grove Productions) 
Sonja Bennett - Cold Squad - Righteous (Keatley MacLeod Productions/Alliance Atlantis)
Ellen Dubin - The Collector - The Campaign Manager (No Equal Entertainment)
Kate Trotter - Paradise Falls - The Dark Side (Breakthrough Entertainment)

Best Performance by an Actor in a Featured Supporting Role in a Dramatic Program or Mini-Series
Richard Zeppieri - Murdoch Mysteries: Except the Dying (Shaftesbury Films)
Chris Potter - Sex Traffic - Part 1 (Big Motion Pictures)
Luke Kirby - Sex Traffic - Part 1 (Big Motion Pictures)
Stefan Arngrim - The Life (CTV/Haddock Entertainment/Odd Man Out Productions/Sarrazin Couture Entertainment)
Jean Pierre Bergeron - Prom Queen: The Marc Hall Story (Screen Door)

Best Performance by an Actress in a Featured Supporting Role in a Dramatic Program or Mini-Series
Maria Popistasu - Sex Traffic - Part 1 (Big Motion Pictures)
Martha Henry - H2O - Night 1 (Whizbang Films)
Miranda Handford - Tripping the Wire: A Stephen Tree Mystery (Galafilm)
Layla Alizada - Chasing Freedom (Alberta Filmworks/Blueprint Entertainment)
Alberta Watson - Choice: The Henry Morgentaler Story (Choice Films)

Best Individual Performance in a Comedy Program or Series
Mary Walsh - Hatching, Matching and Dispatching (CBC)
Levi MacDougall - Comedy Now! - Levi MacDougall (CTV/Hi Guys Ten Productions)
Irwin Barker - Halifax Comedy Festival (CBC Television)
Lewis Black - Just for Laughs (Just for Laughs Comedy Festival/Les Films Rozon)
Colin Fox - Puppets Who Kill - Buttons the Dresser (Eggplant Picture & Sound)

Best Ensemble Performance in a Comedy Program or Series
Cory Bowles, Robb Wells, John Paul Tremblay, Jonathan Torrens, Lucy Decoutere, Barrie Dunn, John Dunsworth, Jeanna Harrison, Sarah Dunsworth-Nickerson, Tyrone Parsons, Patrick Roach, Mike Smith, Shelley Thompson, Michael Jackson, Garry James - Trailer Park Boys - Working Man (Showcase/Topsail Entertainment)
Rick Green, Ron Pardo, Janet van de Graaf, Bob Bainborough, Teresa Pavlinek - History Bites - Elizabeth & Mary: Queen Takes Queen, Checkmate (The History Channel)
Gord Robertson, James Rankin, Bob Martin, Dan Redican, Bruce Hunter - Puppets Who Kill - Buttons on a Hot Tin Roof  (Eggplant Picture & Sound)
Martin Huisman, Louis Philippe Dandenault, Richard Jutras, Annie Bovaird, Paula Boudreau, Alain Goulem, Tracey Hoyt, Kate Greenhouse, Ryan Tilson, Christian Potenza, Cas Anvar, Victor Chowdhury, Dean McDermott, Swikriti Sarkar - The Tournament - Saturday at the Tournament (Adjacent 2 Entertainment/CBC)
Cathy Jones, Shaun Majumder, Gavin Crawford, Mark Critch - This Hour Has 22 Minutes - Episode 12.12 (Alliance Atlantis/CBC)

Best Performance or Host in a Variety Program or Series
Jon Pilatzke, Mathan Pilatzke - The Chieftains in Canada (CBC)
Jamie Cullum - Live at the Rehearsal Hall (Bravo!) 
Alexander Sevastian, Jacques Wood-Eloi, Anne Plamondon, Kristina Reiko Cooper, Cynthia Steljes, Kinga Mitrowska, Peter de Sotto - Canada Day 2004: Merci Montréal (CBC)
Alex Lifeson, Mike Smith, Neil Peart, Geddy Lee, Ed Robertson - Canada for Asia (CBC)
Archie Alleyne, Russ Little, Doug Richardson, Alexis Baro, Ronald Johnston, Michael Shand, Frank Wright - Makin' Noise for Salome (CBC)

Best Performance in a Performing Arts Program or Series
Robert Sokolowski, Josianne Levasseur, Karin Delzors, Pierre-Alexandre Dion, Ewelina Fijolek, Yamoussa Bangoura, Lena Reis, Langis Turcotte, Suzanne Soler, Bartlomiej Soroczynski, Andrzej Sokolowski, Josianne Laporte, Stefan Johannes Wepfer, Sonia Painchaud, Éric Saintonge, Guillaume Saladin - Nomade: At Night, the Sky is Endless (Cirque Éloize)
George Gao, Sarah Slean - 2004 Governor General's Performing Arts Awards (CBC)
Evelyn Hart, Rex Harrington - A Pairing of Swans (Marblemedia/CBC)
Byron Chief-Moon - Quest (Soaring Heart Pictures)

Best Performance in a Children's or Youth Program or Series
Ksenia Solo - renegadepress.com - Can You See Me Now (Vérité Films)
Laurence Leboeuf - 15/Love - Ghost of a Chance (Marathon Media)
Alexz Johnson - Instant Star - Won't Get Fooled Again (DHX Media)
Tasha Pelletier - renegadepress.com - Union (Vérité Films)
Tatiana Maslany - renegadepress.com - Giving Yourself Away (Vérité Films)
Daniel Cook - This is Daniel Cook - This is Daniel Cook Doing Magic (TVOntario/Treehouse TV/Marblemedia/Sinking Ship Entertainment)

Best News Anchor
Kevin Newman - Global National (Global) 
Lloyd Robertson - CTV National News (CTV)
Peter Mansbridge - The National/CBC News (CBC)

Best Reportage
David Akin - CTV National News - CityNews at Six (CTV)
Adrienne Arsenault - The National/CBC News (CBC)
David Common - The National/CBC News (CBC)
Lisa LaFlamme - CTV National News - Mayerthorpe RCMP Murders (CTV)
Janis Mackey Frayer - CTV National News - CityNews at Six (CTV)

Best Host or Interviewer in a News Information Program or Series
Wendy Mesley - Marketplace - Heart of the Matter, Buying Into Sexy (CBC)
Bob McKeown - the fifth estate - Bio of Dick Cheney, Do You Believe in Miracles?, Sticks and Stones (CBC)
Gillian Findlay - the fifth estate - First, Do No Harm (CBC)
Seamus O'Regan - Canada AM - Aug 06, 2004, Apr 26, 2005, Mar 7, 2005 (CTV)
Carole MacNeil - CBC News: Sunday (CBC)

Best Host or Interviewer in a Lifestyle/General Interest or Talk Program or Series
Evan Solomon - Hot Type (CBC Newsworld)
Avery Haines - Health on the Line (HOTL Productions)
Evan Solomon - CBC News: Sunday Night (CBC)
Mary Walsh - The Greatest Canadian - The Great Frederick Banting (CBC)
Jay Ingram - Daily Planet - Tsunami Special (Discovery Channel)

Best Host in a Lifestyle/Practical Information, or Performing Arts Program or Series
Kevin Brauch - The Thirsty Traveler - Absinthe (Grasslands Entertainment)
Marilyn Denis - CityLine (Citytv)
Mike Holmes - Holmes on Homes (General Purpose Entertainment)
Gregory Charles - 2004 Governor General's Performing Arts Awards (CBC)
Candice Olson - Divine Design (Fusion Television)

Best Host or Interviewer in a Sports Program or Sportscast
Scott Russell - CBC Sports Saturday (CBC Sports)
Tom Harrington - The National/CBC News - Sports Journal: Olympic Standards/Sports Psychologist (CBC)
James Duthie - Canada's Game: Hockey Lives Here (TSN)
Darren Dreger - 2004 Playoff Edition: Theoren Fleury (TSN)
Deborah Grey - The Greatest Canadian - The Great Wayne Gretzky (CBC)

Best Sports Play-by-Play or Analyst
Byron MacDonald, Steve Armitage - Athens 2004: The Olympic Games Aquatics Coverage
Glen Suitor - CFL on TSN- Wendy's Friday Night Football: Montreal at Hamilton (TSN)
Bob Cole, Harry Neale - The 2004 Stanley Cup Finals - Game Six: Calgary vs Tampa (CBC)

Best Photography in a Dramatic Program or Series
Bernard Couture - The Last Casino (Astral Films)
Chris Seager - Sex Traffic - Part 1 (Big Motion Pictures)
David Frazee - The Life (CTV/Haddock Entertainment/Odd Man Out Productions/Sarrazin Couture Entertainment)
Jean Lépine - A Bear Named Winnie (Original Pictures, Powercorp)
Norayr Kasper - The Death and Life of Nancy Eaton (Muse Entertainment/Indian Grove Productions/Studio Eight Productions/Voice Pictures)

Best Photography in a Comedy, Variety, Performing Arts Program or Series
Rick McVicar - Puppets Who Kill - Cuddles the Manchurian Candidate (Eggplant Picture & Sound)
Christopher J. Romeike - Opening Night - The Four Seasons Mosaic (CBC)
Horst Zeidler - Beethoven's Hair (BBC/CBC/Dor Film/Rhombus Media/Telefilm Canada/Xenophile Media)
Réal Truchon - Canada Day 2004: Merci Montréal (CBC)
Jean-Pierre St-Louis - Naked Josh - Celibacy (Sextant Productions/Cirrus Communications)
Steve Cosens - Show Me Yours, Chapter One (Barna-Alper Productions/IYD Productions)

Best Photography in an Information Program or Series
Ian Hannah - Past Life Investigation (CBC)
Paul Seeler - the fifth estate - First, Do No Harm (CBC)
Jim Nilson - CBC News: Country Canada - Legacy (CBC)
Richard Agecoutay - No Glory (CBC)
Aldo Columpsi, Ted Hilbig - Football First: The Roy Shivers Story (CBC)

Best Photography in a Documentary Program or Series
Derek Rogers - The Nature of Things - Shipbreakers (CBC)
Douglas Pike, John Westheuser - Rage Against the Darkness: Bunny and Leona (J.S. Kastner Productions)
Christopher Ball, Robert MacDonald - Diet of Souls (Triad Film Productions)
Jay Ferguson - Animals
John Westheuser - Shake Hands with the Devil: The Journey of Roméo Dallaire (White Pine Pictures/CBC)

Best Visual Effects
Michelle Comens, Tom Brydon, Jose Burgos, John Gajdecki, Dan Mayer, Jinnie Pak, Wes Sargent, Bruce Woloshyn - Stargate Atlantis - Rising (Acme Shark Productions/Sony Pictures Television)
Paul Furminger, Abel Milanes - The Collector - The Historian (No Equal Entertainment)
Michelle Comens, Simon Ager, Jose Burgos, Geoff Anderson, Dan Mayer, Mark Breakspear, Tara Conley, Bruce Woloshyn, Tristam Gieni, Todd Liddiard - Stargate Atlantis - The Eye (Acme Shark Productions/Sony Pictures Television)
Michelle Comens, James Halverson, Brett Keyes, Krista McLean, Bradley Mullennix, James Rorick, Craig Van Den Biggelaar, Karen Watson - Stargate SG-1 - New Order, Part 2 (Stargate SG-1 Productions)
James Tichenor, Chris Doll, Shannon Gurney, James Halverson, Krista McLean, Craig Van Den Biggelaar, Karen Watson, Bruce Woloshyn - Stargate SG-1 - Lost City, Part 2 (Stargate SG-1 Productions)
Steven Hodgson, Rosemary Conte - The Collector - The Historian (No Equal Entertainment)

Best Picture Editing in a Dramatic Program or Series
Sylvain Lebel - The Last Casino (Astral Films)
Tom Joerin - ReGenesis - Spare Parts (The Movie Network/Movie Central/Shaftesbury Films)
Mark Day - Sex Traffic - Part 1 (Big Motion Pictures)
Mike Lee - Prom Queen: The Marc Hall Story (Screen Door)
Ron Wisman - A Bear Named Winnie (Original Pictures/Powercorp)

Best Picture Editing in a Comedy, Variety, Performing Arts Program or Series
Stéphanie Grégoire, Gareth C. Scales - The Tournament (Adjacent 2 Entertainment/CBC)
Cathy Gulkin, Jeff Bessner - Opening Night - The Four Seasons Mosaic (CBC)
Peter Steel, Jessica McKee - ZeD - Art and Soul (CBC)
David New - Beethoven's Hair (BBC/CBC/Dor Film/Rhombus Media/Telefilm Canada/Xenophile Media)
Ken Gray, Tharanga Ramanayake -  Freedom - Rubberbandance (Sound Venture International)

Best Picture Editing in an Information Program or Series
Loretta Hicks - the fifth estate - Sticks and Stones (CBC)
Leslie Steven Onody - the fifth estate - War Without Borders (CBC)
Claude Panet-Raymond - the fifth estate - Do You Believe in Miracles? (CBC)
Gil Tétreault - CBC News: Country Canada - Shoot, Shovel & Shut Up (CBC)
Michael Hannan - Past Life Investigation (CBC)

Best Picture Editing in a Documentary Program or Series
Michèle Hozer - Shake Hands with the Devil: The Journey of Roméo Dallaire (White Pine Pictures/CBC)
Ricardo Acosta - The Take (Barna-Alper Productions/CBC/NFB/Klein Lewis Productions)
Jim Goertzen - The Greatest Canadian - The Great Tommy Douglas (CBC)
Lawrence Jackman - Animals
Deborah Palloway - The Nature of Things - Shipbreakers (CBC)

Best Production Design or Art Direction in a Dramatic Program or Series
Candida Otton - Sex Traffic - Part 1 (Big Motion Pictures)
Jean-François Campeau - The Last Casino (Astral Films)
Philip Schmidt - Behind the Camera: The Unauthorized Story of Mork & Mindy (NBC Studios/Nomadic Pictures/Once Upon a Time Films)
Kathleen Climie - Dark Oracle - Recruitment (Cookie Jar Entertainment/Shaftesbury Films)
Ron Stefaniuk, Pamela Mingo - The Doodlebops - Growing Moe (Cookie Jar Entertainment)

Best Production Design or Art Direction in a Non-Dramatic Program or Series
Peter Faragher - Juno Awards of 2005 (Canadian Academy of Recording Arts and Sciences/CTV)
Callum MacLachlan - 2004 MuchMusic Video Awards (MuchMusic)
Jean Babin - Ciao Bella - Magic (Cirrus Communications)
Sherri Hay - The Surreal Gourmet (Salad Daze Productions)
Guy Lalande - The Tournament (Adjacent 2 Entertainment/CBC)

Best Costume Design
Anushia Nieradzik - Sex Traffic - Part 1 (Big Motion Pictures)
Michael Harris - H2O - Night 1 (Whizbang Films)
Siobhan Gray - The Life (CTV/Haddock Entertainment/Odd Man Out Productions/Sarrazin Couture Entertainment)
Madeleine Stewart - Murdoch Mysteries: Except the Dying (Shaftesbury Films)
Nicoletta Massone - Choice: The Henry Morgentaler Story (Choice Films)

Best Achievement in Make-Up
Marilyn O’Quinn - The Eleventh Hour - Zugzwang (Alliance Atlantis) 
Beverley Keigher - The Life (CTV/Haddock Entertainment/Odd Man Out Productions/Sarrazin Couture Entertainment)
Samantha Rumball - Chasing Freedom (Alberta Filmworks/Blueprint Entertainment)
Djina Caron - Ciao Bella - Magic (Cirrus Communications)
Todd Masters, Leah Ehman - Stargate Atlantis - Before I Sleep (Acme Shark Productions/Sony Pictures Television)

Best Sound in a Dramatic Program
John Laing, Todd Beckett, Robert Bertola, Keith Elliott, Mark Gingras, Tim O’Connell, Jill Purdy, John J. Thomson, Mark Zsifkovits - Lives of the Saints (Capri Films/PowerCorp/RTI)
Leon Johnson, Jean-Raphaël Dedieu, Don Dickson, Peter Hodges, Virginia Storey, Mark Wright - A Bear Named Winnie (Original Pictures, Powercorp)
Sylvain Arseneault, Kathy Choi, Sue Conley, Barry Gilmore, Steve Hammond, Ronayne Higginson, Janice Ierulli, Garrett Kerr, Martin Lee, David McCallum, Ian Rankin, Mark Shnuriwsky, Jane Tattersall, Robert Warchol - H2O (Whizbang Films)
Kathy Choi, Barry Gilmore, Steve Hammond, Ronayne Higginson, Janice Ierulli, Garrett Kerr, Stephan Carrier, David McCallum, Lou Solakofski, Mark Shnuriwsky, Jane Tattersall, Robert Warchol, Rod Deogrades, Simon Okin, Jane Porter - Sex Traffic - Part 1 (Big Motion Pictures)
Patrick Haskill, Brad Hillman, Andre Iwanchuk, Nicole Thompson, James Kusan, Miguel Nunes, John R.S. Taylor - The Life (CTV/Haddock Entertainment/Odd Man Out Productions/Sarrazin Couture Entertainment)

Best Sound in a Dramatic Series
Kelly Cole, Rick Bal, Jacqueline Cristianini, Mike Olekshy, Joe Spivak - Cold Squad - And the Fury (Keatley MacLeod Productions/Alliance Atlantis)
Brad Hillman, Patrick Haskill, Miguel Nunes, John R.S. Taylor, Nicole Thompson, William Skinner - Da Vinci’s Inquest - Before They Twist The Knife (Haddock Entertainment/Barna-Alper Productions/Alliance Atlantis/CBC)
Justin Drury, Ric Jurgens - Radio Free Roscoe - There Will Be No Encore Tonight (Decode Entertainment)
Warren St. Onge, Rob Bryanton, Jeff Hamon, Larry McCormick, Evan Rust - renegadepress.com - Dying to Connect (Vérité Films)
Mark Hensley, Stephen Cheung, Ian Emberton, Craig Stauffer, Greg Stewart - The Collector - The Historian (No Equal Entertainment)

Best Sound in a Comedy, Variety, or Performing Arts Program or Series
Joe Knauer, Jane Tattersall, David Rose, David McCallum, Sanjay Mehta, Martin Lee, Steve Hammond, Lou Solakofski, Brent Pickett, Ronayne Higginson, Jiri Slanina - Beethoven's Hair (BBC/CBC/Dor Film/Rhombus Media/Telefilm Canada/Xenophile Media)
Joe Petrella, Jeff Wolpert - The Language of Love
Ron Searles, Danny Greenspoon - The Magical Gathering (CBC)
Philippe Scultéty, Peter Lopata, Roger Guérin, Stan Sakellaropoulos, Tony Jackson - Fungus the Bogeyman - Episode 2 (BBC/Galafilm/Indie Kids/Powercorp)
Ian Dunbar, Doug McClement, Howard Baggley, Marc Laliberté, Simon Bowers, Michael Molineux, Peter Campbell - Juno Awards of 2005 (Canadian Academy of Recording Arts and Sciences/CTV)

Best Sound in an Information/Documentary Program or Series
Chris McIntosh, Brent Marchenski, Alexander Hall - Making the Cut, Episode 12 (Network Entertainment)
Jeremy Short, Chris Cobain, John Clarke - Life and Times - Ashley MacIssac: Me, Myself and The Devil (CBC)
Jakob Thiesen, Daniel Pellerin, Russell Walker, Alan Geldart, Ao Loo - Shake Hands with the Devil: The Journey of Roméo Dallaire (White Pine Pictures/CBC)
Brian Schwarz, Dwayne Newman, Daniel Pellerin, Jason Milligan, Geoff Raffan - The Take (Barna-Alper Productions/CBC/NFB/Klein Lewis Productions)
Kevin Tokar, Philip Strong - Continuous Journey (Peripheral Visions)
France Leduc, Nicholas Gagnon, Fredéric Cloutier, Bernard Gariépy Strobl - Be the Creature - Expedition Orangutan Decode Entertainment/Kratt Brothers Company)

Best Original Music Score for a Program or Mini-Series
Amin Bhatia - In The Dark (Megalomania Films)
Jonathan Goldsmith - Chasing Freedom (Alberta Filmworks/Blueprint Entertainment)
Armando Trovajoli - Lives of the Saints (Capri Films/PowerCorp/RTI)
Schaun Tozer - The Life (CTV/Haddock Entertainment/Odd Man Out Productions/Sarrazin Couture Entertainment)
Robert Carli - Murdoch Mysteries: Except the Dying (Shaftesbury Films)

Best Original Music Score for a Dramatic Series
Gary Koftinoff - Dark Oracle (Cookie Jar Entertainment/Shaftesbury Films)
Luc Sicard - Ciao Bella - Catherine The Great (Cirrus Communications)
Colin Towns - Fungus the Bogeyman - Episode 1 (BBC/Galafilm/Indie Kids/Powercorp)
James Jandrisch - Show Me Yours, The Following Game (Barna-Alper Productions/IYD Productions)
Carl Lenox - The Doodlebops - ABRACADEEDEE (Cookie Jar Entertainment)

Best Original Music Score for a Documentary Program or Series
Murray C. Anderson, Warrick Sony - Life and Times - Madiba: The Life & Times of Nelson Mandela (CBC)
Philip Strong, Kiran Ahluwalia, Ben Grossman, Shahid Ali Khan, Mark Korven, Ravi Naimpally - Continuous Journey (Peripheral Visions)
Mark Korven - Winning
Daniel Toussaint - Miracle Planet - The Violent Past (NHK/NFB)
Christian Clermont, Claude Castonguay, Marc Ouellette - Mystery Hunters - Anastasia, Anna Anderson (Apartment 11 Productions)

Best Original Music Score for an Animated Program or Series
Amin Bhatia, Ari Posner - King - Stolen Voices (Decode Entertainment/Funbag Animation Studios)
Amin Bhatia, Meiro Stamm - Franny's Feet - You Bug Me, Double Trouble - Decode Entertainment/Family Channel/Channel 5)
Jeff Danna - Miss Spider's Sunny Patch Kids - Humbug, Dashing Through the Snow (Nelvana, Callaway Arts & Entertainment)
Ian Thomas - Care Bears - Journey to Joke-a-Lot (DIC Entertainment)
Serge Côté - Kevin Spencer - The Buck Stops Here (Atomic Productions)

Special Awards
Gordon Sinclair Award for Broadcast Journalism - David Halton
Earle Grey Award - Steve Smith
Academy Achievement Award - David Greene
Canada Award: Tasha Hubbard, Bonnie Thompson - Two Worlds Colliding
Gemini Humanitarian Award - Roger Abbott, Luba Goy, Don Ferguson - Air Farce Live
Viewer's Choice Award for Lifestyle Host: Marilyn Denis, CityLine
Gemini Award for Most Popular Website Competition: Sandy Yang, Wendy Smith, Noelle Paredes - Canadian Idol - idol.ctv.ca

References 

Gemini Awards
Gemini Awards, 2005
Gemini Awards, 2005